Bubba Bolden (born May 29, 2000) is an American football strong safety for the Cleveland Browns of the National Football League (NFL). Bolden initially played college football at USC from 2017 to 2018 before transferring to Miami in 2019.

Professional career

Seattle Seahawks
Bolden signed with the Seattle Seahawks as an undrafted free agent on May 6, 2022. He was waived on August 20, 2022.

Cleveland Browns
On November 22, 2022, Bolden was signed to the Cleveland Browns practice squad. He signed a reserve/future contract on January 9, 2023.

References

External links
 Cleveland Browns bio
 USC Trojans bio
 Miami Hurricanes bio

2000 births
Living people
Players of American football from Nevada
American football safeties
USC Trojans football players
Miami Hurricanes football players
Seattle Seahawks players
Cleveland Browns players